The Suicide Collectors is the debut novel of American author David Oppegaard. Published by St. Martin's Press in December 2008, it was a finalist for the 2008 Bram Stoker Award for Superior Achievement in a First Novel, awarded by the Horror Writers Association.

Synopsis
The Suicide Collectors is set in a near future version of North America.  A mysterious plague called the Despair has ravaged the earth, causing roughly 90% of its population to commit suicide.  The Collectors appear after each suicide to collect the bodies.  The story centers on Norman who leaves Florida on a journey to Seattle where a doctor may have a cure for the Despair.

Reception

Publishers Weekly praised Oppegaard's "eloquent prose and haunting characters."  Bookmarks Magazine said critics were "clearly affected by the images that populate Oppegaard's sorrowful world."

References

External links
 Official website 
 Author's website

2000s horror novels
2008 science fiction novels
American science fiction novels
2008 American novels
Post-apocalyptic novels
Fiction about suicide
2008 debut novels